Loarre is a municipality in the province of Huesca, Spain. As of 2010, it had a population of 371 inhabitants.

See also 
 Loarre Castle

References

External links 

Municipalities in the Province of Huesca